The Committee of Selection (Malay: Jawantankuasa Pemilih; ; Tamil: மலேசிய பொதுமக்கள் தேர்வுக் குழு) is a select committee of the House of Representatives in the Parliament of Malaysia. The committee is best known for appointing members of committees established under resolutions of the House and the Standing Orders for Public Business. Members are elected at the beginning of each session.

Membership

15th Parliament

14th Parliament
As of May 2018, the committee's membership was as follows:

13th Parliament

12th Parliament

11th Parliament

10th Parliament

9th Parliament

8th Parliament

7th Parliament

6th Parliament

5th Parliament

4th Parliament

3rd Parliament

2nd Parliament

1st Parliament

See also
Parliamentary Committees of Malaysia

References

External links
COMMITTEE OF SELECTION - HOUSE OF REPRESENTATIVES

Parliament of Malaysia
Committees of the Parliament of Malaysia
Committees of the Dewan Rakyat